Major Sir Geoffrey Ernest Tritton CBE DL (3 November 1900 – 15 November 1976), was a British businessman, soldier and Liberal Party politician, who later joined the Conservative party.

Background
Tritton was born the son of Sir Alfred Tritton. He was educated at Eton and Trinity College, Cambridge. In 1925 he married Mary Patience Winifred Foster. They had one son and one daughter. He succeeded his father as Baronet in 1939. He was appointed a CBE in 1958.

Professional career
Tritton was a partner in a firm of discount brokers and achieved the rank of Major as an officer in the Territorial Army Rifle Brigade. He was appointed as a Deputy Lieutenant for Wiltshire.

Political career
Tritton was Liberal candidate for the Henley division of Oxfordshire at the 1929 General Election. Henley was a Unionist seat. The Liberals had come within 1,000 votes of winning Henley at the 1923 General Election. At the 1924 General election, the majority was more than 6,000. Tritton's prospects of winning were set back when the Labour Party, who had not run a candidate in either 1923 or 1924, decided to intervene. He retained second place but was unable to reduce the Unionist majority. After this experience he did not contest another general election for 21 years and by then he had changed his party. He was Conservative candidate for the Swindon division of Wiltshire at the 1950 General Election. Swindon was a Labour seat and he managed to retain second place out of four candidates. He contested Swindon again at the 1951 General Election, this time in a two-candidate contest with Labour, but still lost. He did not stand for parliament again, but during the 1950s served as a member of Wiltshire County Council.

Electoral record

See also
Tritton baronets

References

1900 births
1976 deaths
Alumni of Trinity College, Cambridge
Baronets in the Baronetage of the United Kingdom
British Army personnel of World War II
Commanders of the Order of the British Empire
Conservative Party (UK) parliamentary candidates
Members of Wiltshire County Council
Liberal Party (UK) parliamentary candidates
People educated at Eton College
Geoffrey